In compressed sensing, the nullspace property gives necessary and sufficient conditions on the reconstruction of sparse signals using the techniques of -relaxation. The term "nullspace property" originates from Cohen, Dahmen, and DeVore. The nullspace property is often difficult to check in practice, and the restricted isometry property is a more modern condition in the field of compressed sensing.

The technique of -relaxation 
The non-convex -minimization problem,

is a standard problem in compressed sensing. However, -minimization is known to be NP-hard in general. As such, the technique of -relaxation is sometimes employed to circumvent the difficulties of signal reconstruction using the -norm. In -relaxation, the  problem,

is solved in place of the  problem. Note that this relaxation is convex and hence amenable to the standard techniques of linear programming - a computationally desirable feature. Naturally we wish to know when -relaxation will give the same answer as the  problem. The nullspace property is one way to guarantee agreement.

Definition 
An  complex matrix   has the nullspace property of order , if for all index sets  with  we have that:   for all .

Recovery Condition 
The proof of the theorem is a standard one, and the proof supplied here is summarized from Holger Rauhut.

 Let   be a   complex matrix. Then every -sparse signal  is the unique solution to the -relaxation problem with  if and only if  satisfies the nullspace property with order .

References

Linear algebra